Cosmopterix dacryodes is a moth of the  family Cosmopterigidae. It is widely found in Mauritius and Rodrigues in the Indian Ocean.

The wingspan is about 7 mm.

References

dacryodes
Moths described in 1910
Moths of Mauritius